Colin Hanlon (born November 1) is an American actor, known for his role on Submissions Only.

Biography
Hanlon has a BFA in Drama from Syracuse University.

After appearing in numerous commercials, Hanlon began work in the theatre. He has appeared on Broadway as Gordon, Mark, and Roger in Rent, and played Fiyero in the national tour of Wicked. Off-Broadway, he has starred as Frederic in The Pirates of Penzance and Austin Bennett in I Love You Because. He also appeared in the world premiere of Edges. On screen, he starred as Tim Trull on the web series Submissions Only, which ran for three seasons, and played Steven on Modern Family. In 2015, he starred as Pete in the new play The 12 at the Denver Center, for which he won a Henry Award.

Theatre credits

TV credits

Film credits

Discography

Awards

References

External links
 

21st-century American male actors
21st-century American singers
American male musical theatre actors
American male television actors
American gay actors
Living people
Place of birth missing (living people)
Syracuse University alumni
Year of birth missing (living people)
American male web series actors
21st-century American male singers
21st-century LGBT people